Diocese  of Artik ( Artiki t'em), is a diocese of the Armenian Apostolic Church covering the southern part of Shirak Province of Armenia, including the towns of Artik, Maralik, and their surrounding villages.

The diocese is based in the historical Armenian town of Artik, within the historic Shirak canton of Ayrarat province of ancient Greater Armenia.

The Diocese of Artik was officially founded on 2 December 2012, when it was separated from the Diocese of Shirak, upon a kontakion issued by Catholicos Karekin II. The seat of the diocese is the 7th-century Saint Gregory the Illuminator Cathedral, currently being entirely reconstructed. The prelacy is based in the nearby Varagatun religious complex, consecrated in 2012.

References

External links
Churches of Gegharkunik Province

Artik
Oriental Orthodox dioceses in Armenia
Shirak Province